Kataysk is the name of several inhabited localities in Russia.

Urban localities
Kataysk, Kurgan Oblast, a town in Kataysky District of Kurgan Oblast

Rural localities
Kataysk, Tyumen Oblast, a village in Nikulinsky Rural Okrug of Sladkovsky District in Tyumen Oblast